G Beem Rao is an Indian politician and was a member of the 14th Tamil Nadu Legislative Assembly from the Maduravoyal constituency. He represented the Communist Party of India (Marxist) party.

The elections of 2016 resulted in his constituency being won by P. Benjamin.

Electoral performance

References 

Tamil Nadu MLAs 2011–2016
Living people
Year of birth missing (living people)